Street Racer is a 2008 action film by The Asylum. It's meant to be a mockbuster of the film Speed Racer, but its overall plot bears a closer similarity to The Fast and the Furious, and particularly The Fast and the Furious: Tokyo Drift, which had been released in 2006. The film is advertised by The Asylum as being based on true events.

Plot 
Johnny Wayne (Clint Browning) is an ex-racer who serves 5 years in prison after crippling a young boy during an illegal street race in Los Angeles. Wayne, having been traumatised by the events, vows to never race again, and is soon released as a reformed citizen.
Whilst Johnny attempts to restore his life and become an honest, hardworking member of society, his parole officer has other plans for him.  Johnny finds himself being blackmailed into street racing by his parole officer and the taunts of his former street racing associates.  Johnny is given a job at a wrecking yard, owned by Red.  Johnny and Red get off to a rocky start but end up becoming friends.  Red teaches Johnny how to improve his racing skill. Johnny is assigned to volunteer community service as part of his parole and he winds up working at a rehabilitation facility where a boy, Danny/Daniel (Connor Herlong), crippled 5 years earlier in a car accident, gets his physical therapy as he tries to relearn to walk.  
Danny and his older sister take a liking to Johnny.  Johnny inspires Danny to give maximum effort to his physical therapy and Danny progresses.  
Johnny slowly comes to the realization that Danny is the boy he crippled in the wreck he caused 5 years earlier but does not know how to tell Danny and his sister.  Danny's father sees Johnny at the rehabilitation facility, goes ballistic and reveals the truth to all.  Danny's sister confronts Johnny about the hardship he has placed on Danny and his family, who struggle to make ends meet with staggering medical bills. 
Johnny ends up racing his former friend/now rival Mickey Styles (Jason Ellefson) for the title of the ultimate street racer of Los Angeles and $10k. 
The crooked  parole officer bets against Johnny and instructs Johnny to lose or he will violate his parole and harm Danny and his family.  
Johnny wins the race and $10k which he donates to Danny.
The crooked parole officer gets his just reward when he is hit by street racers and killed.

Cast 
 Clint Browning as Johnny Wayne
 Dorothy Drury as Kelly
 Robert Pike Daniel as Red
 Jason Ellefson as Mickey Styles
 Dustin Fitzsimons as Steve
 Michael Crider as Briggs
 Connor Herlong as Daniel
 T.J. Zale as Robert
 Reggie Jernigan as Derek
 Kelli Dawn Hancock as Armenia
 Sinead McCafferty as Sheila
 Jennifer Dorogi as Teddy
 Jack Goldenberg as Travis

See also 
The Fast and the Furious: Tokyo Drift - A similar film released in 2006
Death Racers (2008) - Another racing film by The Asylum released in the same year
Speed Demon - Another film by The Asylum released in 2003, which bears some similarity to Street Racer
Speed Racer (2008)

Cars 

 2008 Mazda Capella of Johnny Wayne
 [[[[Honda S200 Honda S2000|]]2000 Honda s2000]] of Mickey Styles
 BMW 3 Series (E36)BMW 3 Series (E63)]]|1998 Bmw Serie 3]] of Steve and Johnny Wayne
 Chrysler Town & Country |1990 Chrysler Town & Country]] of Johnny Wayne and Derek
 [[Subaru Impreza |Subaru Impreza]]|2008 Subaru Impreza WRX]] of Johnny Wayne
 2007 Nissan GT-R of Mickey styles
 1991 Porsche 944 (Cameo)
 Lamborghini Countach|1990 Lamborghini Countach LP5000 QV]] of Mickey Styles
 1980 Chevrolet Caprice (Cameo)
 Alfa Romeo 4c (Cameo)

References

External links
 Street Racer at The Asylum
 
 Cinematical - The Asylum Update: Here Comes 'Street Racer'!

2008 action films
2008 independent films
2008 films
2008 direct-to-video films
American action films
Mockbuster films
The Asylum films
American auto racing films
2000s road movies
American road movies
Films set in Los Angeles
Films directed by Teo Konuralp
2000s English-language films
2000s American films